Sapes is a town and a former municipality in the Rhodope regional unit, East Macedonia and Thrace, Greece. Since the 2011 local government reform it is part of the municipality Maroneia-Sapes, of which it is the seat and a municipal unit. The municipal unit has an area of 354.596 km2. The population is 8,383 (2011).

Province
The province of Sapes was one of the provinces of the Rhodope Prefecture. Its territory corresponded with that of the current municipal unit Sapes and the municipality Arriana, except the municipal unit Organi. It was abolished in 2006.

References

Populated places in Rhodope (regional unit)
Provinces of Greece

el:Δήμος Σαπών